The men's 200 metres event at the 2022 African Championships in Athletics was held on 11 and 12 August in Port Louis, Mauritius.

Medalists

Results

Heats
Held on 11 June

Qualification: First 2 of each heat (Q) and the next 8 fastest (q) qualified for the semifinals.

Wind:Heat 1: +3.0 m/s, Heat 2: +3.0 m/s, Heat 3: +2.7 m/s, Heat 4: +2.9 m/s, Heat 5: +3.2 m/s, Heat 6: +2.4 m/s, Heat 7: +1.8 m/s, Heat 8: +2.1 m/s

Semifinals
Held on 11 June

Qualification: First 2 of each semifinal (Q) and the next 2 fastest (q) qualified for the final.

Wind:Heat 1: +3.0 m/s, Heat 2: +2.4 m/s, Heat 3: +3.6 m/s

Final
Held on 12 June

Wind: +3.0 m/s

References

2022 African Championships in Athletics
200 metres at the African Championships in Athletics